This is a List of notable Old Boys of Cranbrook School, Sydney, former students - known as "Old Cranbrookians"of Cranbrook School, an Anglican school in Bellevue Hill, New South Wales, Australia.

Academia and medicine
 Prof. David Cooper HIV researcher
 Prof. Richard HunterRegius Professor of Greek and Fellow of Trinity College, The University of Cambridge
 Yi-Fu TuanEmeritus Professor at the University of Wisconsin-Madison; one of the first Cranbrook students of Asian descent

Business
 Rodney Adlerformer director of failed telecommunications company One.Tel and HIH Insurance
 Mike Cannon-BrookesCEO and co-founder of Atlassian
 Michael Crouch  former Chairman of Zip Industries
 Ken Dixon, chairman of Rowntree's
 James Fairfax former arts patron and philanthropist (also attended Geelong Grammar School)
 David GyngellCEO of Australian commercial broadcasting network, Channel Nine
 Clyde Packerjournalist, media entrepreneur, politician and author
 James Packerchairman of CPH Investments and Crown Limited
 Kerry Packer former media tycoon
 Jodee Richfounder of One.Tel and PeopleBrowsr

Government, politics and the law
 Tim Bruxnerelected former member of the NSW Parliament and Deputy Premier of New South Wales
 Ben Franklinelected member of the Legislative Council of New South Wales
 Hugh Gilchrist (1916–2010)diplomat and author of Australians and Greeks
 David Griffinelected 74th Lord Mayor of Sydney
 Michael Knight elected former member of the NSW Parliament and Sydney 2000 Olympics Minister
 Julian Martin Leesermember for Berowra
 Dugald Munroformer grazier and Member for Eden-Monaro
 Andrew Rogers justice of the Supreme Court of New South Wales; spouse of Helen Coonan, a former Australian Senator
 Sir Laurence Whistler Street 14th Chief Justice of New South Wales

Media, entertainment and the arts
 Kip WilliamsArtistic Director of Sydney Theatre Company
 Oliver Acklandactor
Billy Fieldsinger and songwriter
 John Gadenactor
 Peter Kingston  artist
 Mungo Wentworth MacCallumpolitical journalist, humorist and commentator
 Jim Maxwell ABC Radio cricket commentator
 Garry McDonald comedian, star of Mother and Son and creator of alter-ego Norman Gunston
 Craig McGregorwriter/novelist, academic, and cultural critic
 Andrew Pfeifferlandscape architect
 Sam Reidfilm actor
 Adam Shandwriter and freelance journalist, located in Africa for three years to report on Rwanda and Zimbabwe
 Martin Sharp artist, cartoonist, songwriter, and filmmaker
 Tony Sheldonstage actor/singer, film and TV actor
 Harvey ShoreLogie-winning TV writer/producer
 Nick Vindinkids TV host, all-rounder, entrepreneur sports presenter with SBS World News Australia; travel correspondent with Smooth radio network
 Peter Vogelco-designer of the Fairlight CMI
 Simon Wincerfilm director

Military
 Group Captain Pete Jeffrey WWII fighter ace 
 Air Marshal Sir James Anthony Rowland former naval officer, Governor of New South Wales and Chancellor of the University of Sydney

Sport
 Daniel Batman (1998)Sydney 2000 Olympic 400m runner (also attended The Scots College)
 Edward Cowan (2000)Australian test cricketer
 Paul Darvenizainternational Rugby Union Wallaby
 James Hunter (2009)basketball player
 Luke KendallAustralian basketball player
 Will Langford (2010)Australian rules football premiership player (2014) for Hawthorn Football Club
 Cecil Purdy chess International Master and inaugural World Correspondence Chess champion
 Murray Rose (1956)Olympic gold medal swimmer
 Steven Solomon (2011)London 2012 Olympic 400m runner
 William SomervilleNew Zealand cricket bowler
 Ed Stubbs (2006)Australian Rugby 7s representative

See also
 Combined Associated Schools
 :Category:People educated at Cranbrook School, Sydney

References

External links
 Cranbrook School website
 Old Cranbrookians website

Combined Associated Schools
Cranbrook School, Sydney
Lists of people educated in New South Wales by school affiliation
 *
Cranbrook Old Boys